Groom & Tattersall was a company of ironfounders and engineers in Towcester, Northamptonshire.

Company registrations 
The company was founded in 1900 by Alfred Rishworth Tattersall (1863-July 1949) as Messrs. Groom and Tattersall, Ltd., although the oldest records go back to 1876. On 27 April 1918, Groom & Tattersall, Limited was registered at Station Works Tiffield Road in Towcester, Northamptonshire.

Inventions, awards and products 

Alfred Rishworth Tattersall invented an improved apparatus for distilling wood, peat and other substances, and a centrifugal dresser. He received in 1917 the John Scott Award on behalf of City of Philadelphia for his Midget Marvel Flour Mill. This was a small and simple flour mill for farming communities, in which water mills had been abandoned. The company built for instance the Petrolia petrol locomotive for the Blakesley Miniature Railway.

References 

Defunct engineering companies of England
Economy of Northamptonshire
British companies established in 1900